The Estimate Audit Committees is a group of two select committees of the House of Commons in the Parliament of the United Kingdom. It has a remit to support the Clerk of the House of Commons and the Accounting Officer of the House of Commons.

Membership 
As of 20 March 2019, the members of the committee are as follows:

See also 
 List of Committees of the United Kingdom Parliament
 Select committee (United Kingdom)

References 

Select Committees of the British House of Commons